This Adultery Is Ripe is the debut studio album by the American post-hardcore band The Blood Brothers, released in August 2000.  Produced by Matt Bayles, this album was recorded over a weekend  on a limited budget, and has been described as "stripped-down" and catchy by singer Jordan Blilie The artwork to This Adultery Is Ripe is almost entirely composed of pictures taken from the 1967 film The Graduate, which is described as a "cinematic masterpiece" in the liner notes.

Track listing

Personnel
The Blood Brothers
Jordan Blilie – vocals
Mark Gajadhar – drums
Morgan Henderson – bass
Cody Votolato – guitar
Johnny Whitney – vocals

Production and design
Matt Bayles - producer
The Blood Brothers - co-producer
Dan Dean – design
Ian Bartholomew – photography

Release history

References

The Blood Brothers (band) albums
2000 albums
Albums produced by Matt Bayles